In enzymology, a D-arabinitol 4-dehydrogenase is an enzyme that catalyzes the chemical reaction

D-arabinitol + NAD+  D-xylulose + NADH + H+

Thus, the two substrates of this enzyme are D-arabinitol and NAD+, whereas its 3 products are D-xylulose, NADH, and H+.

This enzyme belongs to the family of oxidoreductases, specifically those acting on the CH-OH group of donor with NAD+ or NADP+ as acceptor. The systematic name of this enzyme class is D-arabinitol:NAD+ 4-oxidoreductase. Other names in common use include D-arabitol dehydrogenase and arabitol dehydrogenase. This enzyme participates in pentose and glucuronate interconversions and fructose and mannose metabolism.

References

 Characterization of Arabitol Dehyrogenase in Transplastomic Plants. LAP Lambert Academic Publishing. 
 
 

EC 1.1.1
NADH-dependent enzymes
Enzymes of unknown structure